The 2017 Czech Hockey Games were played between 27 and 30 April 2017. The Czech Republic, Finland, Sweden and Russia played a round-robin for a total of three games per team and six games in total. Five of the games were played in České Budějovice, Czech Republic, and one game in Stockholm, Sweden. The tournament was won by the Czech Republic.

Standings

Games
All times are local.
Stockholm and  České Budějovice – (Central European Summer Time – UTC+2)

References

Czech
Sport in České Budějovice
International sports competitions in Stockholm
Czech Hockey Games
Czech
Czech
2010s in Stockholm